WOKC (True Country) is a commercial radio station in Okeechobee, Florida, broadcasting to the Okeechobee area on 1570 AM and 100.9 FM. WOKC's format is classic country.  It also broadcasts local and world news quite often.

FM Translator
WOKC programming is relayed to an FM translator in order to widen the station's coverage area, especially during nighttime hours when the AM broadcasts with only 12 watts.  The FM Broadcasting frequency also gives the listener the ability to listen in stereophonic high fidelity sound.

External links
Station website

OKC
Radio stations established in 1965
1965 establishments in Florida